Pettigrew is an unincorporated community in Madison County, Arkansas, United States. The community is in the Boston Mountains along the banks of the headwaters of the White River. Pettigrew has a post office with ZIP code 72752.

References

Unincorporated communities in Madison County, Arkansas
Unincorporated communities in Arkansas